National Olympic and Sports Committee of Mali (IOC code: MLI) is the National Olympic Committee representing Mali.

See also
 Mali at the Olympics

References

Mali
Mali at the Olympics